Dichomeris isa is a moth in the family Gelechiidae. It was described by Ronald W. Hodges in 1986. It is found in North America, where it has been recorded from Oklahoma, Arkansas, Florida, Georgia, Illinois, Kentucky, Massachusetts, Mississippi, Missouri, New Jersey, New York, North Carolina, Ohio, Pennsylvania, Tennessee, Texas and Ontario.

The wingspan is about 13 mm. The forewings range from dark gray to blackish with a broad white stripe along the costa. The inner edge of this stripe has two small oblique projections, pointing toward the outer margin. The hindwings are medium gray.

References

Moths described in 1986
isa